Karen Egdal (born 15 February 1978) is a Danish former swimmer who won two silver medals in the 50 m butterfly event at the European championships in 2000. She also competed at the 1996 Summer Olympics in the 4×100 m freestyle relay. She retired from competitive swimming in 2003.

References

1978 births
Danish female freestyle swimmers
Swimmers at the 1996 Summer Olympics
Danish female butterfly swimmers
Olympic swimmers of Denmark
Living people
European Aquatics Championships medalists in swimming
People from Assens Municipality
Sportspeople from the Region of Southern Denmark